The Mk 14 Enhanced Battle Rifle (EBR) is an American military selective fire battle rifle, and a designated marksman rifle chambered for the 7.62×51mm NATO cartridge. It is a variant of the M14 battle rifle and was originally built for use with units of United States Special Operations Command, such as the United States Navy SEALs, Delta Force,  and task specific Green Berets ODA teams/units.

History
Development began in 2000 with a request by the United States Navy SEALs for a more compact M14 battle rifle. In 2001, Mike Rock Rifle Barrels was the only rifle barrel maker asked by United States Special Operations Command to participate in a SOPMOD conference to create what would be the Mk 14 Mod 0 EBR, with details that include a collapsible stock that was requested for the new rifle and with an aluminum body with telescopic rails. Mike Rock collaborated with engineer Jim Ribordy to make the new rifle. Tests showed that their rifle was effective, but had excessive noise problems.

In 2003, Ron Smith and Smith Enterprise, Inc. created its own version of the M14 EBR (MK14 SEI), which used a medium heavy weight 457 mm (18.0") barrel and was more widely favored than the rifle made by Rock and Ribordy. The Smith Enterprise-based MK14 was then used as a basis to eventually create the Mk 14 Mod 0 with Springfield Armory, Inc. being tasked to supply the necessary machinery needed to create the weapon in cooperation with the Naval Surface Warfare Center Crane Division.

United States Navy SEALs were the first to be armed with the EBR in 2004, followed by the U.S. Coast Guard. The U.S. Army also uses the M14 EBR-RI, being created and updated by the Weapons Product Support Integration Directorate of the TACOM Life Cycle Management Command at the Keith L. Ware Test Facility in Rock Island Arsenal, Illinois;  having fielded approximately 5,000 units by mid-2010. United States Marine Corps units were also considering the EBR, but wound up instead developing the M39 Enhanced Marksman Rifle.

In early 2017, the Army began writing a new requirement for an SDM rifle for combat platoons and squads. Although the Army has been using the M14 EBR since 2009, they had to be turned in when returning from theater, and it had weight issues being almost  unloaded. A new marksman rifle will equip each combat arms squad weighing about  firing standard M80A1 7.62 mm rounds fitted with a rifle optic rather than a telescopic sight. In March 2018, the Army announced that a version of the HK G28, which had already been selected to replace the M110 SASS, would be issued as the service's standard SDMR. Issuing a 7.62 mm SDMR is meant to increase individual squads' ability to defeat enemy body armor that standard 5.56×45mm rounds cannot penetrate. Fielding was planned to start in late 2018.

Design

This weapon upgrades the standard M14 action and replaces the standard  barrel with an  barrel bolted onto a telescoping chassis stock system with a pistol grip, a different front sight, Harris bipod,  four Picatinny accessory rails (which surround the barrel), and a more effective flash hider in place of the standard lugged USGI flash suppressor. A paddle-type bolt stop similar to that of the M4 carbine is used on the rifle. The EBR chassis system stock is made up entirely of lightweight aircraft alloy.

A Kydex hand guard and M68 CCO are also added, though they are almost always replaced with a vertical foregrip and magnifying scope for better handling and for use in a designated marksman role. A Wind Talker suppressor can be mounted on the DC Vortex flash hider, though the U.S. military did not adopt one to active service.

Sage International had some involvement in the decision of whether to invest approximately $120,000 in an injection mold incorporating into the design the rail attachments or machine the replacement stock from a solid billet of aluminum with the latter being selected, which was then shown at the SHOT Show in Orlando in 2003.

The Mk 14 has been criticised for being too heavy, at  when loaded with a 20-round magazine, with most of this weight being at the front of the weapon, making it difficult to aim.

Configurations
Several configurations are available on the Mk 14 Mod 0 EBR, including the attachment of an AN/PVS-4 night vision scope. Others had included the capability of adding two different scopes or sights on the Picatinny rails, for more precision or zoom level.

Variants

Mk 14 Mod 0 
First fielded in 2013, the Mod 0 replaces the M14's stock and handguard, and the operating rod has been redesigned, connecting the barrel to the stock. Designed for use by the U.S. Navy and Marine Corps, its parts are coated with manganese phosphate to help resist corrosion.

M39 Enhanced Marksman Rifle 

The M39 Enhanced Marksman Rifle began development around 2006 at the request of Marine Corps Systems Command, who wanted a versatile semi-automatic rifle that could operate alongside the M40A5. It entered service in 2008, replacing the standard M14 DMR in Marine Corps usage.

Contractors

Military
While the Naval Surface Warfare Center Crane Division creates the military Mk 14 Mod 0 and Mod 1 rifles, Sage International was contracted to provide the weapon's chassis-type stock.

Civilian
The civilian version created by Smith Enterprise Inc. is also known as the MK14 SEI. The Sage EBR chassis stock is available in a carbine variant known as the M14ALCS/CV. The carbine variant is also known as the MK14 SEI Mod 1.

Others include Fulton Armory, firing in semi-automatic mode instead of fully automatic.

Troy Industries has created a replica of the EBR's modular system made by Naval Surface Warfare Center Crane Division called the Troy Modular Chassis System, which can be used by mounting any functioning M1A or M14 rifle on the MCS.  Philippine arms company FERFRANS has created their version of the Mk 14 Mod 0 called the FERFRANS SOPMOD M14/M1A Enhanced Battle Rifle, which uses a Sage International M14/M1A EBR Tactical Stock System aluminum chassis, an M4 buttstock, and a GRSC M4-62 General Purpose Combat Recticle.

Users

: Used by the Special Air Service Regiment in anti-Taliban operations.
: Iraqi Special Operations Forces
: Used in the wars in Iraq and Afghanistan

Non-state actors
Free Syrian Army

See also
List of individual weapons of the U.S. Armed Forces
List of battle rifles

References

7.62×51mm NATO battle rifles
Rifles of the United States
Designated marksman rifles
Military equipment introduced in the 2000s